Filip Turek (born May 24, 1972 in České Budějovice) is a Czech professional ice hockey forward. He played 11 years in Ceske Budejovice and then he went to AIK Hockey in Sweden. After less than one year in Sweden he came back to Czech Republic. He currently plays for the team HKm Zvolen in Slovak Extraliga.

External links
 Filip Turek´s  profile at hockeydb.com

1972 births
Czech ice hockey forwards
AIK IF players
Espoo Blues players
HC Dukla Jihlava players
HC Tábor players
HC Vítkovice players
HKM Zvolen players
Motor České Budějovice players
Sportspeople from České Budějovice
Living people
Czech expatriate ice hockey players in Sweden
Czech expatriate ice hockey players in Finland
Czech expatriate ice hockey players in Slovakia
Czechoslovak ice hockey forwards